Kumamoto Prefectural Seiseikou High School is a co-educational public senior high school located in Kumamoto, Kumamoto prefecture. 
It is one of the Super Global High Schools in Japan.

Notable alumni

Academic 
 Einosuke Harada
 Jun-Ichiro Mukai
 Kang Sang-jung

Fine Art 
 Tetsuya Noda

Politics 
 Adachi Kenzō
 Korekiyo Otsuka
 Toshio Ōtsu
 Morio Takahashi
 Toshikatsu Matsuoka
 Minoru Kihara

References

External links 
 Seiseiko High School

Kumamoto
Schools in Kumamoto Prefecture